Rabah is a village in northwestern Syria, administratively part of the Homs Governorate, located west of the city of Homs. Nearby localities include Muklous to the west, Hawash and Zweitina to the southwest, Shin to the southeast, al-Mahfurah to the east, al-Qabu, Syria to the northeast and Fahel to the north. According to the Syria Central Bureau of Statistics (CBS), Rabah had a population of 2,341 in 2004. Its inhabitants are predominantly Greek Orthodox Christians.

References

Bibliography

 

Populated places in Homs District
Eastern Orthodox Christian communities in Syria
Christian communities in Syria